Carlos Aguilar (born May 25, 1988) is an American soccer player who is currently an assistant coach at San Diego State University.

Career

College and amateur
Carlos attended Palmdale High School played two years of college soccer at Taft College, where he scored both goals as his team won the 2007 California Collegiate State Soccer Championship, before transferring to the University of California, Irvine in his junior year. He scored six goals and made seven assists UCI in his senior season, and was named to the All-Big West Conference First Team.

During his college years Aguilar also played with the Lancaster Rattlers and Bakersfield Brigade in the USL Premier Development League.

Professional
Undrafted out of college, Aguilar signed with Rochester Rhinos in February 2010. He made his professional debut on April 10, 2010 in Rochester's season opening game against Miami FC, and went on to make two further appearances in his debut pro season.

Aguilar was not listed on the 2011 Rochester roster released April 12, 2011, and subsequently returned to California to play for Los Angeles Blues 23 in the USL Premier Development League.

Honors

Rochester Rhinos
USSF Division 2 Pro League Regular Season Champions (1): 2010

References

External links
 UC Irvine bio
 SDSU bio

1988 births
Living people
Soccer players from California
Lancaster Rattlers players
Bakersfield Brigade players
Rochester New York FC players
OC Pateadores Blues players
USL League Two players
USSF Division 2 Professional League players
UC Irvine Anteaters men's soccer players
People from Palmdale, California
Association football midfielders
American soccer players
Taft Cougars men's soccer players
UC Irvine Anteaters men's soccer coaches
Cal State Fullerton Titans men's soccer coaches
San Diego State Aztecs men's soccer coaches